is a municipality in Agder county, Norway. It is located in the traditional district of Lister. The administrative centre of the municipality is the town of Farsund. Farsund is a coastal municipality in the far southwestern part of Norway, bordering Kvinesdal municipality in the north and Lyngdal in the north and east.

The  municipality is the 276th largest by area out of the 356 municipalities in Norway. Farsund is the 116th most populous municipality in Norway with a population of 9,622. The inhabitants of Farsund are concentrated in three centres of population: the town of Farsund (population: 3,265), Vanse (population: 2,016), and Vestbygda (population: 1,123). Loshavn with its wooden buildings is located outside the town of Farsund. Other villages in Farsund include Ore, Rødland, and Sande.

General information

The town of Farsund was established as a municipality on 1 January 1838 (see formannskapsdistrikt law), although it was already recognized as a trading center in 1795. The present municipality of Farsund was established on 1 January 1965 when the rural municipalities of Herad, Lista, and Spind were merged with the town of Farsund. On 1 January 1971, the Ytre og Indre Skarstein farms (population: 21) located along the western shore of the Rosfjorden were transferred from Lyngdal to Farsund.

Name
The municipality is named Farsund, after the small island of Farøy, which lies in the narrow strait through which the Lyngdalsfjorden passes as it goes by the town. The island's name comes from the Norwegian word far which means "travel" or "journey" (similar to the English word farewell meaning "good journey"). The last element is sund which means "strait" or "sound".

Coat of arms
The coat of arms has been used since 1900 or 1901. It shows four green linden trees (Tilia) on a yellow background. This was chosen to represent the town since linden trees stood in the center of the town for many years.

Churches
The Church of Norway has three parishes within the municipality of Farsund. It is part of the Lister og Mandal prosti deanery in the Diocese of Agder og Telemark.

History
There is evidence of settlement in Farsund and Lista since the Stone Age.

Farsund held a strategic location in the Atlantic wall during World War II, with the Lundebanen and over 400 bunkers built in Farsund municipality, many that can be visited. Between 1940–1945, large Soviet prison camps were located at Lista, with prison camps at Kåde and Ore holding over 600 prisoners. The Soviet prisoners were used as forced labour to build Farsund Airport, bunkers, barracks, and fortifications .

Farsund previously had a hospital, which was closed down in 2007.

Government
All municipalities in Norway, including Farsund, are responsible for primary education (through 10th grade), outpatient health services, senior citizen services, unemployment and other social services, zoning, economic development, and municipal roads. The municipality is governed by a municipal council of elected representatives, which in turn elect a mayor.  The municipality falls under the Agder District Court and the Agder Court of Appeal.

Municipal council
The municipal council of Farsund is made up of 29 representatives that are elected to four year terms. Currently, the party breakdown is as follows:

Economy
The largest industries are Alcoa Lista, an aluminium plant, and Farsund Aluminium Casting AS, which makes auto parts out of aluminium. Historically, shipping and fisheries have also been important. Farsund is the largest agricultural district in the county of Vest-Agder, having  productive land,  of forest, and  freshwater areas. Farsund was already organized as a trading centre in 1795, and in 1995 celebrated its 200-year jubilee.

Trade and shipping laid the foundation for prosperity, and "the city of the strait" was a period one of the world's largest shipping towns in relation to the size of population.

Geography
The municipality sits in southwestern Norway along the North Sea. The Fedafjorden and Listafjorden lie along the northwestern side of the municipality and the Lyngdalsfjorden lies in the eastern part of Farsund. The coastal municipality has two lighthouses: Lista Lighthouse in the west and Søndre Katland Lighthouse in the south.

Climate

Farsund Airport
Farsund Airport, Lista (FAN) was closed in 2002. The airport had from 1955 to 2002 scheduled traffic to Stavanger, Bergen and Oslo. Airlines which have frequented at Lista are among others Braathens SAFE, Norving and Air Stord.

The Airport was built by Luftwaffe in 1940, and they operated the airport with several fighter squadrons during World War II.
After the war, the Royal Norwegian Air Force took over the airport, and for a period it was used as training camp for conscripts.

Today, the airport is privatized and is an industrial area with only minor GA-traffic.

Education
Farsund has 3 primary schools, located in Farsund, Vanse, and Borhaug. Furthermore, there are two junior high schools, in Farsund and Vanse, and two high schools also located in Farsund and Vanse.

Outdoor Activities
Farsund is a town linked to the fjords. Its guest harbour was considered one of the best in Norway, and is full of boats in summer months.
Every year, Strandmila (5k / 10k run) takes place in Husenby Park. The course covers countryside trails, forest paths and sand beaches.
The annual Kaperdagene (Pirate Town) festival takes place in July and depicts a battle between British and Norwegian ships who were fighting a war in the 1800s. It has been running since 1996.
The American Festival (Last weekend in June) is considered one of the most popular festivals in the region. It takes place, as mention in their name, in the last weekend in June in Vanse. And it celebrates the American heritage that many families from Lista brought home with them from the United States in the late 60s and early 70s. It is celebrated with an American inspired parade and also an old Am-Car Parade.

Twin towns
Farsund is twinned with:

Notable people 

 Jochum Brinch Lund (1743–1807) a merchant and shipowner; founded the town of Farsund
 Thomas Fasting (1769–1841) a Norwegian Naval officer and government minister
 Evert Andersen (1772–1809) a Norwegian sea captain who fought in the Gunboat War
 Gabriel Lund (1773–1832) a merchant and rep. at the Norwegian Constituent Assembly
 Eilert Sundt (1817–1875) a theologist and sociologist, worked on mortality and marriage
 James DeNoon Reymert (1821–1896) an American newspaper editor, mine operator, lawyer and pioneer settler in Wisconsin Territory
 Lorentz Severin Skougaard (1837-1885) a Norwegian tenor, moved to the US in 1866
 Abraham Berge (1851–1936) Mayor of Lista, 1882 and Prime Minister of Norway 1923/1924
 Halfdan Sundt (1873–1951) a physician, president of the Norwegian Medical Association
 Vigleik Trygve Sundt (1873–1948) a Norwegian attorney, genealogist and politician
 Richard Birkeland (1879–1928) a mathematician, wrote on the theory of algebraic equations.
 Einar Høiland (1907–1974) a meteorologist, studied the theory of lee waves
 Olav Selvaag (1912–2002) a Norwegian engineer and residential contractor with an innovative approach to designing and building affordable housing
 Odd Starheim DSO (1916–1943) a Norwegian resistance fighter and SOE agent in WWII
 Vesla Vetlesen (born 1930) a Norwegian weaver, trade unionist, writer and politician
 Alf Meberg (born 1942) a Norwegian pediatrician, works on congenital heart defects
 Toril Moi (born 1953) academic, writer and works on feminist theory and women's writing
 Kjell Elvis (born 1968) a Norwegian professional Elvis impersonator
 Ingvild Stensland (born 1981) a footballer with 144 caps with Norway women

References

External links

Municipal fact sheet from Statistics Norway 
Some Photographs of Farsund in August 1986, including the Torvestuene
Farsund Kommune

 
Municipalities of Agder
1838 establishments in Norway